The first series of Ross Kemp: Extreme World, a British documentary series, was broadcast on Sky 1 between 21 February and 21 March 2011.

Episodes

Home media
The first series was released on to DVD on 28 March 2011 on region 2 only.

Ratings

References

Ross Kemp: Extreme World
2011 British television seasons